Luigi de Amato (died 1530) was a Roman Catholic prelate who served as Bishop of San Marco (1515–1530), Bishop of Lipari (1506–1515), and Bishop of Rapolla (1497–1506).

Biography
On 12 September 1497, Luigi de Amato was appointed during the papacy of Pope Alexander VI as Bishop of Rapolla.
On 19 September 1506, he was appointed during the papacy of Pope Julius II as Bishop of Lipari.
On 26 January 1515, he was appointed during the papacy of Pope Leo X as Bishop of San Marco.
He served as Bishop of San Marco until his death in 1530.

See also 
Catholic Church in Italy

References

External links and additional sources
 (for Chronology of Bishops) 
 (for Chronology of Bishops) 
 (for Chronology of Bishops) 
 (for Chronology of Bishops) 
 (for Chronology of Bishops) 
 (for Chronology of Bishops) 

15th-century Italian Roman Catholic bishops
16th-century Italian Roman Catholic bishops
Bishops appointed by Pope Alexander VI
Bishops appointed by Pope Julius II
Bishops appointed by Pope Leo X
1530 deaths